Consolida oliveriana is a plant species in the genus Consolida. The plant is native to Iran, Iraq, and Turkey.

Uses
Consolida oliveriana contains the flavonol chemical compound trifolin.

References

External links 

oliveriana
Flora of Iran
Flora of Iraq
Flora of Turkey